Lupinus citrinus is a species of lupine known by the common names orange lupine, orangeflower lupine, and fragrant lupine. It is endemic to California, where it is known from a section of the Sierra Nevada foothills extending from Mariposa to Fresno Counties. The herbage is coated in tiny white hairs. The inflorescence bears several flowers, sometimes in whorls. Each flower is roughly a centimeter long and orange to yellow to white in color.

References

External links
Photo gallery

citrinus
Endemic flora of California